The Rosenmund–von Braun synthesis is an organic reaction in which an aryl halide reacts with cuprous cyanide to yield an aryl nitrile.

The reaction was named after Karl Wilhelm Rosenmund who together with his Ph.D. student Erich Struck discovered in 1914 that aryl halide reacts with alcohol water solution of potassium cyanide and catalytic amounts of cuprous cyanide at 200 °C. The reaction yields the carboxylic acid,  not the nitrile, but Rosenmund speculated that the intermediate should be the nitrile. Independently Alfred Pongratz and  improved the reaction by changing the reaction conditions to higher temperatures and used no solvent for the reaction. Further improvement of the reaction was done in the following years, for example the use of ionic liquids as solvent for the reaction.

See also
Kolbe nitrile synthesis a similar reaction for the synthesis of alkyl nitrile
Sandmeyer reaction
Von Braun reaction

References

Substitution reactions
Name reactions